William Brownlow Gray (October 25, 1931 – November 2010) was a Bermudian sailor. He was born in Montreal, Quebec. He competed for Bermuda at the 1960 Summer Olympics.

References

External links
Brownlow Gray's profile at Sports Reference.com
Brownlow Gray's obituary

1931 births
2010 deaths
Canadian emigrants to Bermuda
Bermudian male sailors (sport)
Canadian male sailors (sport)
Sportspeople from Montreal
Olympic sailors of Bermuda
Sailors at the 1960 Summer Olympics – Finn